Şehzade Mehmed Ertuğrul Efendi (5 November 1912 – 2 July 1944) was an Ottoman prince, the only son of Sultan Mehmed VI and his second consort Müveddet Kadın. He was the last child of Mehmed.

Early life

Şehzade Mehmed Ertuğrul was born on 5 November 1912 in his father's mansion in Çengelköy. His father was Mehmed VI, son of Abdulmejid I and Gülistu Kadın. His mother was Müveddet Kadın, daughter of Kato Davut Çıhcı and Ayşe Hanım. He was the only son and fourth and last child born to his father and the only child of his mother. Ertuğrul was educated privately. His tutor was Kaymakam Emin Bey, who taught literature in the imperial school.

Life in exile
When his father left Turkey on 17 November 1922, he only took Ertuğul with him, and a small number of Palace officials with him. The other members of the family, including his mother, later joined them in Sanremo in 1924. He and his mother were assigned one floor in his father's villa. After his father's death in 1926, Ertuğrul, who was then fourteen years old, left his mother, and went to live in with in elder half-sister, Sabiha Sultan.

His mother meanwhile went to Egypt, married a Turk there, and then taking the advantage of the law allowing the widows of the sultans to return to Turkey, moved back to Istanbul, and settled in the mansion in Çengelköy, which she jointly owned. Ertuğrul always refused to accept his mother's second marriage, and never saw her again. He was then enrolled in a boarding school in Grasse, where he studied for several years.

Ertuğrul was often seen at the Maadi Sporting Club lurking in the shady alleys separating the tennis courts from the swimming pool. Certain wags claimed the prince hung around blind spots in anticipation of ambushing unsuspecting Maadi belles. In fact, the result of a failed ambush led to his suspension from the club for an entire month.

Death
Ertuğrul died at the age of thirty-one at Cairo, Egypt on 2 July 1944. He had fallen sick during a tennis match, and died few hours later of an unidentified illness. He was buried in the mausoleum of Abbas Hilmi Pasha, Cairo. His death devastated his mother, who fell into depression and never recovered.

Honour 
 Order of the House of Osman

Ancestry

References

Sources

1912 births
1944 deaths
20th-century Ottoman royalty
Ottoman princes
Royalty from Istanbul
Disease-related deaths in Egypt